You Can Tell 'Em I Said It is a stand up DVD by comedian Eddie Griffin, released by Comedy Central. The DVD was released by Comedy Central on February 28, 2011. Containing special features, deleted scenes and all completely uncensored and uncut.

Production
You Can Tell 'Em I Said It was filmed in late 2010.

References

External links

Stand-up comedy concert films
2011 comedy films
American comedy films